Albert William Baker (May 4, 1918 – March 6, 2008) was a Canadian aviator and aeronautical engineer. He was inducted into Canada's Aviation Hall of Fame in 2000.

References

 Oswald, Mary, They Led the Way, Wetaskiwin: Canada's Aviation Hall of Fame, 1999.

External links
Hall of Fame site

1918 births
2008 deaths
Canadian aerospace engineers
Canadian Aviation Hall of Fame inductees
People from Montreal